Marinobacter lutaoensis is a Gram-negative, heterotrophic, thermotolerant, strictly aerobic and non-spore-forming bacterium from the genus of Marinobacter which has been isolated from a hot spring from the coast of Lutao in Taiwan.

References

Further reading

External links
Type strain of Marinobacter lutaoensis at BacDive -  the Bacterial Diversity Metadatabase	

Alteromonadales
Bacteria described in 2003